Staffan Stockenberg defeated Dezső Vad in the final, 6–0, 6–8, 5–7, 6–4, 6–2 to win the boys' singles tennis title at the 1948 Wimbledon Championships.

Draw

Final

Group A

Group B

References

External links

Boys' Singles
Wimbledon Championship by year – Boys' singles